R.H. Capener was a footballer who played one game as a forward for Burslem Port Vale in 1898.

Career
Capener joined Burslem Port Vale on a trial basis in August 1898. His Second Division debut came at inside-right in a 2–0 loss to Leicester Fosse at the Athletic Ground on 12 November. This proved to be his only appearance and he was released, most probably at the end of the season.

Career statistics
Source:

References

Year of birth missing
Year of death missing
English footballers
Association football forwards
Port Vale F.C. players
English Football League players
19th-century British people